Someș-Odorhei is a commune located in Sălaj County, Crișana, Romania. It is composed of five villages: Bârsa (Dabjonújfalu), Domnin (Dabjon), Inău (Inó), Someș-Odorhei and Șoimuș (Szilágysolymos).

Sights 
 Wooden Church in Bârsa, built in the 18th century, historic monument
 Wooden Church in Domnin, built in the 18th century (1753), historic monument
 Wooden Church in Inău, built in the 19th century (1832), historic monument

Image gallery

References

Communes in Sălaj County
Localities in Crișana